Pine Lake is a lake in Otter Tail County, in the U.S. state of Minnesota.

Pine Lake was named for the white pine trees near the lake shore.

See also
List of lakes in Minnesota

References

Lakes of Otter Tail County, Minnesota
Lakes of Minnesota